Hereward the Wake (Traditional pronunciation /ˈhɛ.rɛ.ward/, modern pronunciation /ˈhɛ.rɪ.wəd/) (1035 – 1072) (also known as Hereward the Outlaw or Hereward the Exile) was an Anglo-Saxon nobleman and a leader of local resistance to the Norman Conquest of England. His base, when leading the rebellion against the Norman rulers, was the Isle of Ely in eastern England. According to legend he roamed the Fens, which nowadays covers parts of the modern counties of Cambridgeshire, Lincolnshire and Norfolk, leading popular opposition to William the Conqueror.

Hereward is an Old English name, composed of the elements here, "army", and ward "guard" (cognate with the Old High German name Heriwart). The epithet "the Wake", first recorded in the 14th century, may mean "the watchful", or derive from the Anglo-Norman Wake family who later claimed descent from him.

Primary sources
Several primary sources exist for Hereward's life, though the accuracy of their information is difficult to evaluate. They are the version of the Anglo-Saxon Chronicle written at Peterborough Abbey (the "E manuscript" or Peterborough Chronicle), the Domesday Book, the Liber Eliensis (Latin 'Book of Ely') and, much the most detailed, the Gesta Herewardi.

The texts are sometimes contradictory. For example, Gesta Chapter XXVIII places Hereward's attack on Peterborough Abbey after the Siege of Ely whereas the Peterborough Chronicle (1070) has it immediately before. This probably indicates, as the preface to the Gesta suggests, that conflicting oral traditions about Hereward were already current in the Fens in the late 11th and early 12th centuries. In addition, there may be some partisan bias in the early writers: the notice of Hereward in the Peterborough Chronicle, for instance, was written in a monastery which he was said to have sacked, some fifty years after the date of the raid. On the other hand, the original version of the Gesta was written in explicit praise of Hereward; much of its information was provided by men who knew him personally, principally, if the preface is to be believed, a former colleague-in-arms and member of his father's former household named Leofric the Deacon.

Gesta Herewardi
The Gesta Herewardi (or Herwardi) is a Middle Latin text, probably written around 1109–31.
The 12th-century Latin text purports to be a translation of an earlier (and now lost) work in Old English, with gaps in the damaged original filled out from oral history. The earliest surviving copy of the Gesta Herewardi is in a manuscript produced around the middle of the 13th century at Peterborough Abbey, along with other materials relating to the abbey. This 13th-century manuscript is known as the "Register of Robert of Swaffham".

What is known of the earlier history of the Gesta Herewardi comes from its prologue, according to which the original text was written in Old English by Leofric, a priest of Hereward's household, who became one of his companions in arms during Hereward's resistance to William the Conqueror. Leofric's work may have been precipitated by Hereward's death.
The prologue also reports that the earlier, Old English version was badly damaged, though not destroyed: the author of the Gesta Herewardi had been instructed by his superior to seek out the remains of Leofric's work and to translate it into Latin. This he did, but, owing to its damaged condition, he filled in the resulting lacunae from oral history, at his superior's insistence.
It has been argued that the author of Gesta Herewardi was Richard of Ely, and that his superior was Bishop Hervey of Ely, who held that office from 1109 to 1131.

The version of the Gesta Herewardi which exists today is a transcription of this work, which was incorporated into a book containing charters and other material relating to the abbey at Peterborough known as the "Register of Robert of Swaffham", though variant descriptions such as "Robert of Swaffham's Book" are also found. According to the historian Janet D. Martin, the book was created in "about 1250", and originally ended with the Gesta Herewardi, but further material, unrelated to the Hereward story, was added in the 14th century.

A serial edition of the Gesta Herewardi translated by W. D. Sweeting was published from 1895 as a supplement to Fenland Notes and Queries: this was a quarterly magazine, published at Peterborough, of which Sweeting was editor at the time. He used a transcription of the Gesta Herewardi by S. H. Miller to produce an edition in which the transcription and translation appear in parallel columns.

Life and legend

Family

Partly because of the sketchiness of evidence for his existence, his life has become a magnet for speculators and amateur scholars. The earliest references to his parentage, in the Gesta, make him the son of Edith, a descendant of Oslac of York, and Leofric of Bourne, nephew of Ralph the Staller. Alternatively, it has also been argued that Leofric, Earl of Mercia and his wife Lady Godiva were Hereward's real parents. There is no evidence for this, and Abbot Brand of Peterborough, stated to have been Hereward's uncle, does not appear to have been related to either Leofric or Godiva. It is improbable that − if Hereward were a member of this prominent family – his parentage would not be a matter of record. Some modern research suggests him to have been Anglo-Danish with a Danish father, Asketil; since Brand is also a Danish name, it makes sense that the Abbot may have been Asketil's brother. Hereward's apparent ability to call on Danish support may also support this theory.

Hereward's birth is conventionally dated as 1035/36 because the Gesta Herewardi says that he was first exiled in 1054 in his 18th year. However, since the account in the Gesta of the early part of his exile (in Scotland, Cornwall and Ireland) contains fantastic elements, it is hard to know if it is trustworthy. Peter Rex, in his 2005 biography of Hereward, points out that the campaigns in which he is reported to have fought in the region of Flanders seem to have begun around 1063 and suggests that, if he was 18 at the time of his exile, he was born in 1044/45. But this would be based on the assumption that the early part of the story is largely fictitious.

His birthplace is supposed to be in or near Bourne in Lincolnshire. In those times it was a boggy and marshy area. Since the holdings of abbeys could be widely dispersed across parishes, the precise location of his personal holdings is uncertain but was certainly somewhere in south Lincolnshire.

Exile
According to the Gesta Herewardi, Hereward was exiled at the age of eighteen for disobedience to his father and disruptive behaviour, which caused problems among the local community. He was declared an outlaw by Edward the Confessor. The Gesta tells various stories of his supposed adventures as a young man while in exile in Cornwall, Ireland and Flanders. These include a fight with an enormous bear, and the rescue of a Cornish princess from an unwanted marriage. Many historians consider these tales to be largely fictions. Having arrived in Flanders he joined an expedition against "Scaldemariland" (probably islands in Scheldt estuary). Historian Elizabeth van Houts considers this aspect of the story to be consistent with evidence concerning expeditions led by Robert the Frisian on behalf of his father Baldwin V, Count of Flanders in the early 1060s. Peter Rex also accepts that these events probably occurred.

At the time of the Norman conquest of England, he was still in exile in Europe, working as a successful mercenary for Baldwin V. According to the Gesta he took part in tournaments in Cambrai. At some point in his exile Hereward is said to have married Turfida, a Gallo-Germanic woman from a wealthy family in Saint-Omer. She is said in the Gesta to have fallen in love with him before she met him, having heard of his heroic exploits.

Return to England

The Gesta Herewardi says Hereward returned to England a few days after the death of Count Baldwin V of Flanders, who died on 1 September 1067. The Gesta says that he discovered that his family's lands had been taken over by the Normans and his brother killed with his head then placed on a spike at the gate to his house. Hereward took revenge on the Normans who killed his brother while they were ridiculing the English at a drunken feast. He allegedly killed fifteen of them with the assistance of one helper. He then gathered followers and went to Peterborough Abbey to be knighted by his uncle Abbot Brand. He returned briefly to Flanders to allow the situation to cool down before returning to England.

The Gesta claims that William de Warenne's brother-in-law Frederick swore to kill Hereward, but Hereward outwitted him and killed him. Since Hereward's killing of Frederick is also attested in the independent Hyde Chronicle, this event is regarded as "almost certainly" true. William himself later pursued Hereward, but Hereward supposedly unhorsed him with an arrow shot.

In 1070 Hereward certainly participated in the anti-Norman insurrection centred on the Isle of Ely. In 1069 or 1070 the Danish king Sweyn Estrithson sent a small army to try to establish a camp on the Isle of Ely. Hereward appears to have joined them. Hereward stormed and sacked Peterborough Abbey in company with local men and Sweyn's Danes. While the Gesta says this was after the main battle at Ely, the Peterborough Chronicle says it was before. The historical consensus is that the Chronicle's account is most accurate. His justification is said to have been that he wished to save the Abbey's treasures and relics from the rapacious Normans led by the new Norman abbot who had ousted his uncle Brand. According to the Gesta he returned the treasures looted from the abbey after having a vision of Saint Peter. However, the Peterborough Chronicle says that the treasure was carried off to Denmark.

Hereward was then joined by a small army led by Morcar, the Saxon former Earl of Northumbria who had been ousted by William. William sent an army to deal with the rebels. In 1071, Hereward and Morcar were forced to retreat to their stronghold and made a desperate stand on the Isle of Ely against the Conqueror's rule. Both the Gesta Herewardi and the Liber Eliensis claim that the Normans made a frontal assault, aided by a huge, mile-long timber causeway, but that this sank under the weight of armour and horses. The Normans then tried to intimidate the English with a witch, who cursed them from a wooden tower, but Hereward managed to set a fire that toppled the tower with the witch in it. The Gesta includes other fantastical tales about Hereward's prowess, including disguising himself as a potter to spy on the king and escaping from captivity.

It is said that the Normans, probably led by one of William's knights named Belasius (Belsar), then bribed the monks of the island to reveal a safe route across the marshes, resulting in Ely's capture. An earlier hillfort now known as Belsar's Hill is still extant and sits astride the much older route known as Aldreth's Causeway, which would have been a direct route from the Isle of Ely to Cambridge.

Morcar was taken and imprisoned, but Hereward is said to have escaped with some of his followers into the wild fenland and to have continued his resistance. This escape is noted in all the earliest surviving sources.

This circular feature, known as Belsar's Hill, is a potential site for a fort, built by William, from which to attack Ely and Hereward. There were perhaps as few as four causeways onto the isle itself, with this being the southerly route from London and the likely route of William's army.

Later life

There are conflicting accounts about Hereward's life after the fall of Ely. The Gesta Herewardi says Hereward attempted to negotiate with William but was provoked into a fight with a man named Ogger. The fight led to his capture and imprisonment. His followers, however, liberated him when he was being transferred from one castle to another. Hereward's former gaoler persuaded the king to negotiate once more, and he was eventually pardoned by William and lived the rest of his life in relative peace. It also says that he married a second wife after Turfida entered a convent. She is said have been called Alftruda and was the widow of Earl Dolfin.

Geoffrey Gaimar, in his Estoire des Engleis, says instead that Hereward lived for some time as an outlaw in the Fens, but that as he was on the verge of making peace with William, he was set upon and killed by a group of Norman knights. It is also possible that Hereward received no pardon and went into exile, never to be heard from again; this was in fact the fate of many prominent Englishmen after the Conquest. Ogger ("Oger the Breton"), either the person Hereward is supposed to have fought or an heir, appears to have taken over his lands. Joseph Harrop in his 1764 A New History of England, suggests that after his escape from Ely, Hereward went to Scotland.

Epithet "the Wake"
The epithet "the Wake" (Old English 'wæcnan') is first attested in the late 14th-century Peterborough Chronicle, ascribed by its first editor, Joseph Sparke, to the otherwise unknown John of Peterborough. There are two main theories as to the origin of the tag. The usual interpretation is that it means "the watchful". In Charles Kingsley's novel, Hereward acquires it when, with the help of his servant Martin Lightfoot, he foils an assassination attempt during a hunting party by a group of knights jealous of his popularity. A second theory is that the name was given to him by the Wake family, the Norman landowners who gained Hereward's land in Bourne, Lincolnshire, after his death, to imply a family connection and therefore legitimise their claim to the land. The family claimed descent from Hereward's daughter by his second wife, Alftruda. Within the Gesta, Hereward is instead given the epithet 'outlaw'.

Historicity

The existence of Hereward is not generally disputed, though the story of his life, especially as recounted in the Gesta, almost certainly contains exaggerations of his deeds and some outright fictions. Hugh M. Thomas argues that the Gesta is intended to be an entertaining story about an English hero, creating a fantasy of successful resistance to the Normans. Hereward is always motivated by honest emotions and displays chivalric values in his warfare, unlike his enemies. His supreme manly prowess is constantly emphasised. Potentially discreditable episodes such as the looting of Peterborough are excused, and even wiped out by stories such as the vision of St. Peter leading him to return the loot.

The fact of Hereward's participation in the events at Ely is attested in early documents such as the annal for 1071 in the Anglo-Saxon Chronicle. Another text of the Chronicle also tells of his involvement in the looting. Early sources say nothing about him other than the fact that he was at Ely and that he led the last band of resisters. Estoire des Engleis (1140) says that he had a noble family, but is unspecific. His alleged genealogy is given in the Gesta and the later Historia Croylandensis, though with some variations. By the 15th century, the Wake family were claiming descent from him and elevating his ancestry by asserting that he was the son of Leofric, Earl of Mercia and Lady Godiva.

It is possible that some of the stories about Hereward mutated into tales about Robin Hood or influenced them. Hereward nevertheless remained a minor figure until the Victorian period, when the idea of native Anglo-Saxon heroism became popular. Charles Kingsley’s 1865 novel Hereward the Wake: the Last of the English elevated Hereward to the position of a national hero. It drew on the theory that traditional English liberties were destroyed by the "Norman yoke", an idea earlier popularised in Walter Scott's novel Ivanhoe. Both novels helped create the image of a romantic Anglo-Saxon England violated by Norman tyranny. After its publication Hereward appears in numerous popular historical works.

Legacy
  was an H-class destroyer of the Royal Navy commissioned on 9 December 1936.
 "Hereward" is the motto of No. 2 Squadron RAF. They are based at RAF Lossiemouth in Moray and their crest contains a Wake knot.
 BR standard class 7 (otherwise known as the "Britannia Class") locomotive No 70037 carried the name "Hereward the Wake".
 There is a long-distance footpath through the Cambridgeshire fenland from Peterborough to Ely called the Hereward Way.
 From 1980 to 2009, a local radio station broadcasting from Peterborough was called Hereward FM before being relaunched as Heart Peterborough.
 When East Cambridgeshire District Council transferred its housing stock, it created a housing association called "Hereward Housing" to receive the accommodation. This was later taken over by Sanctuary Housing to form Sanctuary Hereward.
 Hampstead has a preparatory school for boys called Hereward House School.
 Loughton has a state primary school named after him.
 Coventry has an integrated-disability college, Hereward College, named after Hereward.
 Hereward Hall is a boys' boarding house at King's Ely school.
 The clipper , a trading vessel built in Glasgow in 1877, was wrecked at Maroubra Beach on 5 May 1898.
 Hereward wheat, bred by Plant Breeding International (now RAGT Seeds) was the most important and widely-grown Group 1 (bread-making) variety in the UK in the 1990s and 2000s.

In popular culture

Folktales and fiction

19th century
The Camp of Refuge, by Charles MacFarlane, pub. 1844
 Thomas Bulfinch wrote about Hereward the Wake in his work: The Age of Fable, or Stories of Gods and Heroes (1855).
Charles Kingsley's novel Hereward the Wake: last of the English (London: Macmillan, 1866) is a highly romanticised account of Hereward's exploits and makes him the son of Earl Leofric of Mercia and the ancestor of the family of Wake.

20th century
The Story of Hereward - The Champion of England, novel by Douglas C. Steadman B.A., illustrated by Gertrude Demain Hammond R.I., pub. 1908 by George G. Harrap and Co. 
Jack Trevor Story (1917–91) wrote a long dramatised life of Hereward for one of Tom Boardman's 1950s boys' annuals.
Man With a Sword, by Henry Treece, 1962, published by the Bodley Head, London. Hereward is the hero of the story. In the first episode he is the champion of the Empress Gunhilda of Germany, and at the end his life extends past the death of William I.
The 1985 Doctor Who Annual included a short story entitled "The Real Hereward". The premise of this story is that Hereward was an alias adopted by King Harold after surviving the Battle of Hastings.
"Let There Be More Light," the opening track on Pink Floyd's 1968 album A Saucerful of Secrets, contains the line "the living soul of Hereward the Wake." Roger Waters and Syd Barrett grew up in Cambridgeshire and would have been particularly familiar with the Hereward legend.
The Saxon Tapestry, by Sile Rice, 1992, published by Hodder & Stroughton LTD, London. Fictional account of the fall of Saxon Britain and Hereward's trials and triumphs. Old motifs and language used this brilliant rendering.
 "The Last Englishman" by Hebe Weenolsen, published 1951 by Doubleday. A historical fiction novel, tells the story of Hereward's return from exile and resistance against the Normans. Includes a fictional romance between Hereward and a Norman Lady named Althya. Written in a charmingly old-fashioned style.

21st century
Hereward is portrayed as a prototype Robin Hood, but also as a drug-taking, psychopathic arsonist, in Mike Ripley's novel The Legend of Hereward the Wake (2007).
Brainbiter: The Saga of Hereward the Wake, by Jack Ogden, pub. 2007
Conquest by Stewart Binns (2011) is an historical novel covering Hereward's life in dramatic and bloody detail. It takes significant dramatic liberties, projecting that Hereward later took the alias 'Godwin of Ely' and worked his way to the Head of Emperor Alexius's Byzantine forces before taking part in the First Crusade, to become a lead strategist of the Princes' Crusade and advisor of Bohemond of Taranto; he appears thus in the sequel, Crusade.
James Wilde has written Hereward (2011), The Devil's Army (2012) and End of Days (2013) chronicling his period in England. The fourth in the series, Wolves of New Rome (2014), takes Hereward and his companions, expelled from England, to Constantinople, meeting new friends and old enemies. The adventure continues in The Immortals (2015) and The Bloody Crown (2016).
Man Booker Prize long-listed The Wake (2014) by Paul Kingsnorth is a historical novel written in a shadow version of old English telling the story of another resistance fighter in the fens whose actions are regularly compared to Hereward.
In Persona 5 Royal, Hereward is the ultimate Persona of Goro Akechi

Broadcasting and film
The BBC made a 16-episode TV series in 1965 entitled Hereward the Wake, based on Kingsley's novel. Hereward was portrayed by actor Alfred Lynch. However, not one episode of this BBC series has survived, according to the archive records.
Hancock's Half Hour – Sid James claims Hereward stayed at Hancock's house as a ploy to get the house renovated by the National Trust.
Brian Blessed portrayed Hereward in the TV drama Blood Royal: William the Conqueror (1990).
BBC TV Series Horrible Histories, series 4, episode 10, features the Siege of Ely including the deployment of a witch as a weapon against the Saxons.
On 26 December 2012 BBC Radio 4 broadcast the story of Hereward as a comic afternoon play, produced by Julia McKenzie, written by David Reed and Humphrey Ker, and performed by the Penny Dreadfuls.

Music 

 "Hereward the Wake" is a song on the 2018 album Tales to be Told Volume II by The Mechanisms, a British steampunk band. The song tells the legend of Hereward's life, reimagined in a sci-fi space setting.

See also
Courteenhall, Northamptonshire home of the Wake family who claim descent from Hereward.

References

Bibliography
Gesta Herewardi Saxoni, ed. T. D. Hardy and C. T. Martin, Lestoire des Engles solum la translaction maistre Geffrei Gaimar. (Rolls Series; 91.) 2 vols: vol 1. London, 1888. pp. 339–404 // tr. M. Swanton, “The Deeds of Hereward” In Medieval Outlaws. Twelve Tales in Modern English Translation, ed. T. H. Ohlgren. 2nd ed. West Lafayette, 2005. 28–99.
Liber Eliensis, ed. E. O. Blake, Liber Eliensis. (Camden Society; ser. 3; vol. 92.) London, 1962 // tr. J. Fairweather. Liber Eliensis: a History of the Isle of Ely from the Seventh Century to the Twelfth. Woodbridge, 2005.
Rex, Peter The English Resistance: the Underground War Against the Normans, Stroud: Tempus , chapters 8, 9 and 10 contain new data on his family.
Hereward, together with De Gestis Herewardi Saxonis; researched and compiled in the 12th century by monastery historians, revised and rewritten in modern English by Trevor A. Bevis, (1982), Pub. Westrydale Press (reissue of 1979 ed), .
Bremmer, R. H., Jr. "The Gesta Herewardi: transforming an Anglo-Saxon into an Englishman", in: T. Summerfield & K. Busby (eds.), People and Texts; relationships in medieval literature: studies presented to Erik Kooper. Amsterdam/New York: Rodopi, 2007, pp. 29–42.
Miller, S.H. (transcription) and Sweeting, W. D. (translation), De Gestis Herwardi Saxonis The exploits of Hereward the Saxon, Fenland Notes & Queries, (vol. 3, supplements), Peterborough, 1895.
 Gaimar, Geoffrey, Lestorie des Engles, Hardy, T.D. & Martin, C.T. (ed. and trans.), Rolls Series, 91 (2 vols.), 1888–89.
 Short, Ian (ed. & trans.), Geffrei Gaimar Estoire des Engleis History of the English, Oxford University Press, 2009.
  Proceedings of the Battle Conference 1998
 De Gestis Herwardi — Le gesta di Ervardo, ed. and Italian tr. Alberto Meneghetti, (ETS) Pisa, 2013.
 Orchard, Andy. "Hereward and Grettir: Brothers from Another Mother?" In New Norse Studies: Essays on the Literature and Culture of Medieval Scandinavia, edited by Jeffrey Turco, 7-59. Islandica 58. Ithaca: Cornell University Library, 2015. http://cip.cornell.edu/cul.isl/1458045710

External links

 
Hereward the Wake — English translation of Gesta Herewardi at River Campus Libraries, University of Rochester
Charles Kingsley, Hereward, the Last of the English, 1865, at Project Gutenburg
David Roffe, Hereward 'the Wake' and the Barony of Bourne: a Reassessment of a Fenland Legend, an academic article, pub. 1994
Geoff Boxell "Hereward the Wake"
BBC documentary on Hereward (streaming audio)

1030s births
1070s deaths
11th-century English people
Anglo-Saxon thegns
Anglo-Saxon warriors
Cambridgeshire folklore
English heroic legends
English rebels
Heroes in mythology and legend
History of Cambridgeshire
History of Peterborough
Medieval legends
Medieval mercenaries
Mercian people
Norman conquest of England
People from Peterborough
Wake family